Donald is an unincorporated community located in the town of Pershing, Taylor County, Wisconsin, United States, where the Canadian National Railway crosses County Highway M.

History
Donald was founded in 1903. It was named by for Donald Campbell, the son of the president of the Fountain-Campbell Lumber Company, which logged in the area. Before that, the spot was called Fountain Spur, for the other principal of that company. A post office was established at Donald in 1904, and remained in operation until it was discontinued in 1942.

Notes

Unincorporated communities in Taylor County, Wisconsin
Unincorporated communities in Wisconsin